Leenaun Hill at , is the 201st–highest peak in Ireland on the Arderin scale, and the 243rd–highest peak on the Vandeleur-Lynam scale.  Leenaun Hill lies on a massif that overlooks Leenaun village and Killary Harbour, and which is at the far northeastern sector of the Maumturks mountain range in the Connemara National Park in Galway, Ireland; this massif is connected to the main range via the "Col of Despondency".  Leenaun Hill is the 6th-highest mountain in the Maumturks, and its grassy massif, constructed from sandstone and siltstone, contrasts with the rocky ridges and summits constructed from quartzites, grits, and graphitic, of the middle and southern sectors of the range.

Naming
Irish academic Paul Tempan records that Leenaun hill has also been called "Bunnaviskaun".  The peak has been called Leenaun Mountain.

Buc Pointu).

Geography
The geology of this massif is derived from siltstone and sandstone, and contrasts sharply with the quartzite and grits of the central spine; while the summits on the massif of Leenaun Hill are grassy with peak hags, in contrast to the rocky ridges of the central spine.

A long northwest to southeast grassy ridge runs through Leenaun Hill's massif, with Leenaun Hill lying close to the centre of the ridge.  To the northwest are the subsidiary peaks of Meall Cheo, whose prominence of  qualifies it as an Arderin Beg.  Further north lies Leenaun Hill Far North-West Top, whose prominence of  also qualifies it as an Arderin Beg.  The most northerly subsidiary peak, and the most northerly peak in the Maumturk range, is Búcán, meaning "spur", whose prominence of  qualifies it as an Arderin.

To the southwest of Leenaun Hill is a long grassy ridge with the minor subsidiary peak of Taobh Dubh , meaning "black hillside".

Hill walking
While the grassy and boggy massif of Leenaun Hill is less appealing to climbers than the rocky peaks of the rest of the Maumturks range, Leenaun Hill and its subsidiary peaks offer well-regarded views of Killary Harbour, Ireland's deepest fjord, and the Mweelrea mountain range.

The most straightforward route to the summit of Leenaun is the 6-kilometre 2–3 hour roundtrip route from the village of Leenaun and back; however, because of its positioning on a high massif, it can also be climbed as an 11-kilometre 4–5 hour loop-route from Leenaun village in the north, summiting to the ridge south of Leenaun Hill, and then turning northwest to summit Leenaun Hill and most of its northerly subsidiary summits before returning to the village.

Leenaun Hill is climbed as part of the Maamturks Challenge, a 25-kilometre 10–12 hour walk over the full Maumturks range (from Maam Cross to Leenaun), which is considered one of the "great classic ridge-walks of Ireland", but of "extreme grade" due to the circa 7,600 feet of total ascent.  Since 1975, the University College Galway Mountaineering Club, has run the annual "Maamturks Challenge Walk" (MCW), and man a checkpoint at Meall Cheo; the summit of Leenaun Hill is optional being southeast of the MCW route as it crosses the "Col of Despondency" from Maumturkmore.

Gallery

Bibliography

See also

Twelve Bens, major range in Connemara
Mweelrea, major range in Killary Harbour
Lists of mountains in Ireland
Lists of mountains and hills in the British Isles
List of Marilyns in the British Isles
List of Hewitt mountains in England, Wales and Ireland

References

External links
The Maamturks Challenge, University College Galway Mountaineering Club
The Maamturks Challenge: Routecard (2015)
MountainViews: The Irish Mountain Website, Leenaun Hill
MountainViews: Irish Online Mountain Database
The Database of British and Irish Hills , the largest database of British Isles mountains ("DoBIH")
Hill Bagging UK & Ireland, the searchable interface for the DoBIH

Marilyns of Ireland
Hewitts of Ireland
Mountains and hills of County Galway
Mountains under 1000 metres